Jiboa River is a river of El Salvador. The river sources from Lake Ilopango and drains into the Pacific Ocean.

References

Rivers of El Salvador